Journal of Polymer Science is a peer-reviewed journal of polymer science currently published in multiple parts by John Wiley & Sons. It was originally established as the Journal of Polymer Science in 1946 by Interscience Publishers and the founding editor Herman F. Mark, but it was split in various parts in 1962. The journal has undergone re-organization several times since. In 2020, the journal will consolidate in one single publication. The editor-in-chief is Ying Jia.

History
Establishment
Journal of Polymer Science (1946–1962), 

First re-organization
Journal of Polymer Science Part A: General Papers (1963–1965), 
Journal of Polymer Science Part A-1: Polymer Chemistry (1966–September 1972), 
Journal of Polymer Science Part A-2: Polymer Physics (1966–September 1972), 
Journal of Polymer Science Part B: Polymer Letters (1963–September 1972), 
Journal of Polymer Science Part C: Polymer Symposia (1963–1972), 

The coverage of biopolymers was split into a distinct journal, Biopolymers.

Second re-organization
Journal of Polymer Science: Polymer Physics Edition (October 1972–1985), 
Journal of Polymer Science: Polymer Letters Edition (October 1972–1985), 
Journal of Polymer Science: Polymer Chemistry Edition (1973–1985), 
Journal of Polymer Science: Polymer Symposia (1973–1986),  

Third re-organization
Journal of Polymer Science Part A: Polymer Chemistry (1986–2019), 
Journal of Polymer Science Part B: Polymer Physics (1986–2019),  
Journal of Polymer Science Part C: Polymer Letters (1986–1990), 

Fourth re-organization
Journal of Polymer Science (2020 onwards),

References

External links

Chemistry journals
Materials science journals
Publications established in 1946
Wiley (publisher) academic journals
English-language journals